The cerebral crus (crus cerebri) is the anterior portion of the cerebral peduncle which contains the motor tracts, travelling from the cerebral cortex to the pons and spine. The plural of which is cerebral crura. 

In some older texts this is called the cerebral peduncle but presently it is usually limited to just the anterior white matter portion of it.

Additional images

See also 
 Efferent nerve fiber
 Motor neuron (efferent neuron)
 Motor nerve

References

External links
 
 
 NIF Search - Cerebral Crus via the Neuroscience Information Framework

Brainstem